Joseph A. Frost (October 28, 1837 in Pennsylvania – ?), settled with his parents to Clyde, Wisconsin in 1849. There, he was involved in farming, business and manufacturing. In 1870, Frost married Jenny Lind Kinzie. They would have five children. His brother-in-law, Robert Kinzie, was also a member of the Assembly.

Political career
Frost was a member of the Assembly during the 1867 session. Other positions he held include member of the County Board of Iowa County, Wisconsin. A Republican, he was affiliated with the National Union Party.

References

People from Iowa County, Wisconsin
Republican Party members of the Wisconsin State Assembly
Farmers from Wisconsin
Businesspeople from Wisconsin
1837 births
Year of death missing